Deisy Estefanía Ojeda González (born 3 March 2000) is a Paraguayan footballer who plays as a left back for Liga MX Femenil side Querétaro and the Paraguay women's national team.

International career
Ojeda represented Paraguay at the 2016 FIFA U-17 Women's World Cup and the 2018 FIFA U-20 Women's World Cup. She made her senior debut on 4 October 2019 in a 1–1 friendly draw against Venezuela.

References

2000 births
Living people
Paraguayan women's footballers
Women's association football fullbacks
Women's association football midfielders
Club Olimpia footballers
Paraguay women's international footballers
Paraguayan expatriate women's footballers
Paraguayan expatriate sportspeople in Israel
Expatriate women's footballers in Israel
21st-century Paraguayan women